Jordan Malik Thomas (born August 2, 1996) is an American football tight end who is a free agent. He played college football at Mississippi State and was drafted by the Houston Texans in the sixth round of the 2018 NFL Draft.

College career
Thomas attended and played college football at Mississippi State under head coach Dan Mullen.

Collegiate statistics

Professional career

Houston Texans
Thomas was drafted by the Houston Texans in the sixth round, 211th overall, of the 2018 NFL Draft. In the Texans' season opener against the New England Patriots, he made his NFL debut. In the 27–20 loss, he had a single reception for 27 yards.

On October 25, 2018, in a Thursday Night Football game against the Miami Dolphins, Thomas had four catches for 29 yards, and his first two career touchdowns in a 42–23 win. He played in 16 games with 10 starts, recording 20 receptions for 215 yards and four touchdowns.

On September 2, 2019, Thomas was placed on injured reserve. He was designated for return from injured reserve on November 11, 2019, and began practicing with the team again. He was activated on November 21.

On September 5, 2020, Thomas was waived by the Texans.

Arizona Cardinals
On September 8, 2020, Thomas was signed to the Arizona Cardinals practice squad. He was elevated to the active roster on September 19 for the team's week 2 game against the Washington Football Team, and reverted to the practice squad after the game. He was promoted to the active roster on September 22. He was waived on November 7, 2020.

New England Patriots
On November 10, 2020, Thomas was claimed off waivers by the New England Patriots. He was placed on the reserve/COVID-19 list by the team on December 26, 2020, and activated and subsequently waived from the team on December 30, 2020.

Indianapolis Colts 
On January 5, 2021, Thomas signed a reserve/future contract with the Indianapolis Colts. He was waived/injured on August 31, 2021 and placed on injured reserve. He was released on September 6, 2021.

Detroit Lions
On January 18, 2022, Thomas signed a reserve/future contract with the Detroit Lions. He was released on March 23, 2022.

St. Louis BattleHawks 
On November 17, 2022, Thomas was drafted by the St. Louis BattleHawks of the XFL. He was released on March 14, 2023.

Statistics

References

External links
Houston Texans bio
Mississippi State Bulldogs bio

1996 births
Living people
American football tight ends
Arizona Cardinals players
Detroit Lions players
Houston Texans players
Indianapolis Colts players
Mississippi State Bulldogs football players
New England Patriots players
People from Sumrall, Mississippi
Players of American football from Mississippi
Sportspeople from Hattiesburg, Mississippi
St. Louis BattleHawks players